Sam Beeton (born Samuel John Beeton, 13 September 1996, Nottingham, England) is a British singer-songwriter and musician. He released his debut single "What You Look For" in September 2008, which reached number 30 in the UK Singles Chart in the week up to 20 September 2008. His first album, No Definite Answer, was released on iTunes in 2008.

Early life
He attended Carlton le Willows School.  Sam Beeton was discovered while playing in a bar, The Old Volunteer he was still at school aged 14. Sam was signed to the Notts County School of Excellence and played for the youth teams for three years at left midfield.

He played in a local young recording band called The Drains who are still playing on the Nottingham circuit. Beeton is involved in local charities as The Julie Cotton Foundation. He always plays at the annual concert at Rock City. He has also modelled for the British fashion label Burberry, notably the Spring 2009 collection.

Music career
Beeton was nominated for the Best Pop Act at the BT Digital Music Awards, and lost to Kylie Minogue. Sam Beeton has supported The Script, Sandi Thom, James Morrison, Scouting for Girls and Charlie Simpson on full UK tours and has also completed one UK tour in his own right. Beeton's first single had an unprecedented run as "record of the week" on the two shows Jo Whiley and Scott Mills of BBC Radio One consecutively.

Discography

Albums

Singles

Other releases
First Takes (debut EP): released 5 March 2007
Sam Beeton's Record Club (Season 1): released November 2010 – December 2011
Sam Beeton's Record Club (Season 2): released May 2012 –

References

English male singers
People from Nottingham
People educated at Carlton le Willows Academy
1988 births
Living people
21st-century English singers
21st-century British male singers